Tenaria was a Spanish cable service born in 2000 from the merger of two regional cable companies:

 Retena, Navarre
 Reterioja, La Rioja

Cable television companies of Spain
2000 establishments in Spain
2000 mergers and acquisitions